A self-propelled modular transporter or sometimes self-propelled modular trailer (SPMT) is a platform heavy hauler with a large array of wheels which is an upgraded version of a hydraulic modular trailer. SPMTs are used for transporting massive objects such as large bridge sections, oil refining equipment, cranes, motors, spacecraft and other objects that are too big or heavy for trucks. Ballast tractors can however provide traction and braking for the SPMTs on inclines and descents.

SPMTs are used in many industry sectors worldwide such as the construction and oil industries, in the shipyard and offshore industry, for road transportation, on plant construction sites and even for moving oil platforms. They have begun to be used to replace bridge spans in the United States, Europe, Asia and more recently Canada.

A typical SPMT has a grid of computer-controlled axles, usually 2 axles across and 4–8 axles along. When two (or more) axles are placed in series, this is called an axle line. All axles are individually controllable, in order to evenly distribute weight and to steer accurately. Each axle can swivel through 270°, with some manufacturers offering up to a full 360° of motion. The axles are coordinated by the control system to allow the SPMT to turn, move sideways or even rotate in place. Some SPMTs allow the axles to telescope independently of each other so that the load can be kept flat and evenly distributed while moving over uneven terrain. Each axle can also contain a hydrostatic drive unit.

A hydraulic power pack can be attached to the SPMT to provide power for steering, suspension and drive functions. This power pack is driven by an internal combustion engine. A single power pack can drive a string of SPMTs.  As SPMTs often carry the world's heaviest loads on wheeled vehicles, they are very slow, often moving at under  while fully loaded. Some SPMTs are controlled by a worker with a hand-held control panel, while others have a driver cabin. Multiple SPMTs can be linked (lengthwise and side-by-side) to transport massive building-sized objects. The linked SPMTs can be controlled from a single control panel.

The first modular self-propelled trailers were built in the 1970s. In the early 1980s, heavy haulage company Mammoet refined the concept into the form seen today. They set the width of the modules at 2.44 m, so the modules would fit on an ISO container flatrack. They also added 360° steering. They commissioned Scheuerle to develop and build the first units. Deliveries started in 1983. The two companies defined the standard units: a 4-axle SPMT, a 6-axle SPMT and a hydraulic power pack. Over the years, new types of modules were added to this system to accommodate a range of payloads.

In 2016 ESTA (the European Association of Abnormal Load Transport and Mobile Cranes) published the first SPMT best practice guide to help address the problem of trailers occasionally tipping over, which happened even when the operating rules and stability calculations had been precisely followed.

Some shipbuilding companies have started to use SPMT instead of gantry cranes for carrying ship sections. This has reduced the cost of transporting huge loads by millions of dollars.

Manufacturers 
 DTA
 Cometto
 Enerpac
 Fagioli
 Faymonville
 
 Mammoet
 Transporter Industry International
 Kamag
 Nicolas
 Scheuerle
 Tiiger

See also

 Heavy hauler
 Applied mechanics
 Hydraulic modular trailer
 Ballast tractor

References

Machines
Modularity
Engineering vehicles
Heavy haulage